This is a list of islands of Qatar, inhabited and uninhabited.
 Al Aaliya Island or Alia Island
 Al Khor Island, also Purple Island and Jazirat bin Ghanim
 Al Safliya Island
 Banana Island
 Halul Island
 Ishat Island
 Pearl Island
 Ras Rakan
 Shrao's Island
 Umm Tais Island

References